Fircrest is a city in Pierce County, Washington, United States. The population was 7,156 at the 2020 census.

History
Fircrest was officially incorporated on September 19, 1925. Like its neighbor University Place, it is a middle-class suburb of Tacoma. The community was developed by Edward Bowes, who later gained fame as the host of the Major Bowes Amateur Hour radio talent show. The town attempted to associate itself with academia by naming a number of its streets after universities (e.g. Princeton, Dartmouth, Yale, Vassar, Stanford) and was originally known as Regents Park in a reference to the regents of a university.

Fircrest was the last "dry" municipality in Washington state, prohibiting the sale of alcohol by the glass. Voters chose to allow the sale of alcohol in Fircrest in the November 2015 election.

Geography
Fircrest is located at  (47.231720, -122.514304).

Government
Since 1990, Fircrest has used a council–manager government, with a city council composed of seven councilmembers. The city mayor is chosen biennially by councilmembers and presides over council meetings. Brett Wittner was appointed mayor in 2022. Additionally, the city council appoints a city manager to carry out day-to-day operations of the city and policies of the council. Colleen Corcoran has been the Interim City Manager of Fircrest since August 2022.

Demographics

2010 census
As of the census of 2010, there were 6,497 people, 2,705 households, and 1,773 families living in the city. The racial makeup of the city was 78.9% White, 7.0% African American, 0.7% Native American, 5.1% Asian, 0.5% Pacific Islander, 0.8% from other races, and 7.0% from two or more races. Hispanic or Latino of any race were 4.6% of the population.

There were 2,705 households, of which 31.2% had children under the age of 18 living with them, 48.2% were married couples living together, 13.3% had a female householder with no husband present, 4.0% had a male householder with no wife present, and 34.5% were non-families. 28.7% of all households were made up of individuals, and 13.6% had someone living alone who was 65 years of age or older. The average household size was 2.39 and the average family size was 2.93.

The median age in the city was 41.2 years. 23.3% of residents were under the age of 18; 7% were between the ages of 18 and 24; 24.8% were from 25 to 44; 27.5% were from 45 to 64; and 17.3% were 65 years of age or older. The gender makeup of the city was 46.1% male and 53.9% female.

2000 census
As of the census of 2000, there were 5,868 people, 2,505 households, and 1,673 families living in the city. The population density was 3,759.4 people per square mile (1,452.3/km2). There were 2,573 housing units at an average density of 1,648.4 per square mile (636.8/km2). The racial makeup of the city was 87.46% White, 5.20% African American, 0.56% Native American, 2.69% Asian, 0.51% Pacific Islander, 0.46% from other races, and 3.12% from two or more races. Hispanic or Latino of any race were 2.69% of the population.

There were 2,505 households, out of which 28.3% had children under the age of 18 living with them, 53.4% were married couples living together, 10.7% had a female householder with no husband present, and 33.2% were non-families. 28.5% of all households were made up of individuals, and 13.3% had someone living alone who was 65 years of age or older. The average household size was 2.34 and the average family size was 2.85.

In the city, the population was spread out, with 23.1% under the age of 18, 5.5% from 18 to 24, 26.3% from 25 to 44, 24.7% from 45 to 64, and 20.4% who were 65 years of age or older. The median age was 42 years. For every 100 females, there were 88.3 males. For every 100 females age 18 and over, there were 83.8 males.

The median income for a household in the city was $54,912, and the median income for a family was $61,611. Males had a median income of $46,611 versus $32,232 for females. The per capita income for the city was $27,244. 5.9% of the population and 4.6% of families were below the poverty line. Out of the total population, 10.2% of those under the age of 18 and 2.7% of those 65 and older were living below the poverty line.

Education
Most of Fircrest is in the Tacoma Public Schools school district, while a part is in the University Place School District.

References

Cities in Washington (state)
Cities in Pierce County, Washington
Cities in the Seattle metropolitan area